Highlandman railway station was a station southeast of Crieff in Perth and Kinross, Scotland. It was built in 1856 for the Crieff Junction Railway, which connected Crieff with the Scottish Central Railway at Crieff Junction (now Gleneagles). The CJR was absorbed by the Caledonian Railway in 1865, which itself became part of the London, Midland and Scottish in 1923.

Highlandman station was named after the drovers who passed through the area on their way between the Highlands and markets in the south.

There was no sizable community in the area. The line and station were closed on 6 July 1964, as part of the Beeching closures.

Personnel
The porter was John Aitken. He and his wife lived in the house.

Today
The station is now a bed and breakfast.

References

External links
RAILSCOT on Crieff Junction Railway
 Highlandman station on navigable 1946 O. S. map

Disused railway stations in Perth and Kinross
Railway stations in Great Britain opened in 1856
Railway stations in Great Britain closed in 1917
Railway stations in Great Britain opened in 1919
Railway stations in Great Britain closed in 1964
Former Caledonian Railway stations
Beeching closures in Scotland